Events in the year 1756 in India.

Events
National income - ₹9,334 million
Suraj-ud-Dowlah captures Calcutta.
19 June – Confinement of prisoners in the Black Hole of Calcutta.
 Seven Years' War, 1756-63.

Deaths 
 Siraj-ud-Din Ali Khan Arzu,  Urdu poet and Lexicographer in Delhi.   (b. 1687)

References

 
India
Years of the 18th century in India